Asliesk Castle is a ruined 16th-century castle about  west of Elgin, Moray, Scotland, near Alves and Monoughty Woods at Asliesk.

History
The property was owned by the Innes or Brodie families.

Structure
Asliesk Castle was an L-plan castle, which had a corbelled-out stair tower, and bartizans.
The foundations can be traced for some metres. The old well of the castle is in the farm-square nearby.  A stone with a coat of arms bearing date 1587 is in a gable.

References

Castles in Moray